Łobez  (formerly ) is a town on the river Rega in northwestern Poland, within the West Pomeranian Voivodeship. It is the capital of Łobez County, and has a population of 10,066 (2019).

The name 

The name Łobez comes from the Old Polish łobuzie (meaning "bushes").

History 

In the 12th century Łobez was a Slavic stronghold located within Poland and after the fragmentation of Poland into smaller duchies within the Griffin-ruled Duchy of Pomerania until its dissolution in 1637. Łobez was first mentioned in a document from 1271, according to which a knight named Borko, who was also the Castellan of nearby Kołobrzeg, was the owner of the town. By 1275 Łobez received town rights. A castle was built in the 13th century.

Demographics 
-

Mayors

Notable residents 
 Otto Puchstein (1856–1911) a German classical archaeologist

International relations

Łobez is twinned with:

Bibliography
 Adam Kogut, Anna Dargiewicz, Barbara Smolska Nazarek: Gmina i miasto Łobez. przewodnik turystyczny / Gemeinde und Stadt Łobez. Reiseführer / Łobez commune and town. Tourist guidebook. Polish - German - English, 64 p., 2001,  .
 Gmina Łobez (Hrsg.): Łobez. pictures from past to present, Polish - German - English, 82 p., 2004,  .

References

External links

 Official town webpage
 Forced laborer justifies municipality partnership between Lobez (Poland) and Affing (Germany) - (German site)
 Tourist Information

Cities and towns in West Pomeranian Voivodeship
Łobez County